Hesar-e Amir Rural District is in the Central District of Pakdasht County, Tehran province, Iran. At the National Census of 2006, its population was 45,082 in 11,125 households. There were 6,659 inhabitants in 1,894 households at the following census of 2011. At the most recent census of 2016, the population of the rural district was 6,465 in 2,044 households. The largest of its 11 villages was Changi, with 2,015 people.

References 

Pakdasht County

Rural Districts of Tehran Province

Populated places in Tehran Province

Populated places in Pakdasht County